The High Trail Vanoise is an international skyrunning competition held for the first time in 2016. It is held every year at the Val-d'Isère in the French Alps at the end of July or beginning of May. The race is part of the Skyrunner World Series.

Races
 High Trail Vanoise, an Ultra SkyMarathon (70 km / 5400 m D+)
 Trail des 6 cols, a SkyMarathon (42 km / 3500 m D+)
 Kilomètre Vertical de Val d’Isère, a Vertical Kilometer (3,5 km / 1000 m D+)

High Trail Vanoise

Kilomètre Vertical de Val d’Isère
Also known as Kilomètre Vertical Face de Bellevarde, was interrupted in 2003 and rescheduled in 2014.

See also 
 Skyrunner World Series

References

External links 
 Official web site

Skyrunning competitions
Skyrunner World Series
Athletics competitions in France
Sport in Savoie
Vertical kilometer running competitions